"Last Temptation" is the nineteenth episode of the seventh season of the American medical drama House. It aired on April 18, 2011. It is also the last episode to feature Amber Tamblyn as Martha Masters until her guest appearance in the series finale.

Plot
On her last day as a medical student, Masters must decide whether to stay on with House's team as an intern or to join Dr. Simpson's surgical team. She initially opts to join the surgical team, but reconsiders House's offer after learning that the last patient she treated under House has taken a turn for the worse.

While brainstorming the case alone, Masters believes Kendall has salmonella, and checks her bones for signs of infection. An MRI reveals a potentially fatal lymphoid sarcoma in Kendall's humerus. Masters tries to convince the patient to amputate the arm but Kendall refuses, and her parents refuse to overrule her.

Unable to accept the patient's decision, Masters goes to House for advice. House suggests that she break the rules if it is so important to her, but she refuses.

After talking once more with the patient, Masters causes Kendall to experience bradycardia and convinces the parents that the cancer has caused a clot to lodge in her heart. By pointing out that had this incident taken place at sea Kendall would be dead, Masters convinces the parents to consent to amputate her arm. Kendall was devastated after the surgery. Kendall's parents thanked Masters for saving her daughters life. At the next morning Masters doesn't feel happy for her decision that she took in Kendall's case though she feels she did the right thing and quits her position at PPTH.

Sub plot
"Thirteen" is back, but House's cover story was that she was in drug rehab and the team is in disbelief. Masters overhears Thirteen confront House about his lie. During the LP Masters performs to deceive House, Thirteen discloses that she has Huntington's disease. When questioned as to why Thirteen would lie about rehab, Thirteen responds that the truth is not something she wants to discuss.

Throughout the episode, House and Wilson have a bet to see who can keep a chicken in the hospital the longest without security catching on. Wilson acquires an Australorp, a quiet breed. In response, House sets up fake chicken footprints leading outside Wilson's office, keeps a fake chicken in his own office, and sets a dog on Wilson's chicken in attempts to get him busted. Wilson is eventually caught, but with House's chicken, which he announces when the security guard asks who the chicken belongs to, and House loses the bet.

Reception

Critical response  
The AV Club gave this episode a B− rating.

References

External links

 "Last Temptation" at Fox.com
 

House (season 7) episodes
2011 American television episodes